Gerald M. Steinberg. a professor of politics at Bar Ilan University, is an Israeli academic, political scientist, and political activist.  He is founder and president of NGO Monitor, a policy analysis think tank focusing on non-governmental organizations.

Biography

Gerald Steinberg was born in the United Kingdom. He completed a joint bachelor's degree in Physics and in Near Eastern Studies at the University of California, Berkeley in 1973, and then a master's degree in Physics at the University of California, San Diego in 1975. He obtained his doctorate in government from Cornell University, in 1981. He began teaching at Bar Ilan University in 1982, and is a professor of Political Science.

Steinberg has served as a consultant to the Israeli Ministry of Foreign Affairs and to the Israeli National Security Council. He also served as a legislative adviser to Likud Knesset Member Ze'ev Elkin.

NGO Monitor

Steinberg is founder and president of the NGO Monitor, an institute whose stated aim is "to generate and distribute critical analysis and reports on the output of the international NGO community" and "to publicize distortions of human rights issues in the Arab-Israeli conflict and provide information and context for the benefit of NGOs working in the Middle East."

Steinberg has been a longtime critic of Human Rights Watch, Amnesty International, Christian Aid, Oxfam and other organizations that he accuses of having "contributed to the hatred, rather than supporting peace". Writing in a 2004 Jerusalem Post article he said, "HRW's press statement exposes it as a biased political organization hiding behind the rhetoric of human rights." Later he accused HRW of "exploiting the rhetoric of human rights to delegitimize Israel". Human Rights Watch accused Steinberg of "sleight of hand" in his reporting of its activities, and of ignoring its condemnations of Palestinian militant actions.

In 2014, former Associated Press journalist Matti Friedman said that AP reporters had been banned from interviewing Steinberg and NGO Monitor. The AP denied the claim.

Court case 
In January 2010, after the European Commission refused to release documents on NGO funding, Steinberg initiated legal action under the EU's Freedom of Information statutes. The court ruled that instability in the Middle East and the prospect that "such information may pose a danger to human rights groups" justified the refusal. The court further found that Steinberg's petition was "manifestly lacking any foundation in law."

Commenting on Steinberg's failed legal action, Israeli attorney Michael Sfard commented that "Steinberg invents demons and then chases them. On the way, he convinces the Europeans that the fears for the welfare of Israeli democracy are justified. All the data about the donations of foreign countries to Israeli human rights organizations are published on the Web sites of the organizations, as required by law."

Criticism
Yehudit Karp, a former Israeli deputy attorney general, charged that Steinberg published material he knew to be wrong "along with some manipulative interpretation".

Reporter Uriel Heilman commented that Steinberg played "fast and loose" with the facts by repeating comments about the New Israel Fund which Steinberg knew to be untrue. Following this comment, Steinberg acknowledged that some of his reports were poorly phrased and promised to correct them.

Writing in the Jerusalem Post, Kenneth Roth says that Steinberg displayed a "disregard for basic facts" when writing about human rights.

References

External links
 NGO Monitor home page

Living people
Israeli political scientists
Academic staff of Bar-Ilan University
American Jews
American emigrants to Israel
Israeli Jews
Cornell University alumni
University of California, San Diego alumni
University of California, Berkeley alumni
Israeli columnists
Bonei Zion Prize recipients
Year of birth missing (living people)